d'Aubigné is a French surname. Notable people with the surname include:
 Constant d'Aubigné
Jean-Henri Merle d'Aubigné, Swiss Protestant minister and historian
Agrippa d'Aubigné, French poet, soldier, propagandist, and chronicler

French-language surnames